David Guzman (born 1978, in Barcelona) is a cultural journalist specialising in literature and music.

On Catalunya Ràdio he is director and presenter of two weekly literature programmes Ciutat Maragda and L’irradiador (icat FM), and worked in El Café de la República with Joan Barril, as well as the programmes Catalunya Vespre, Estat de Gràcia and El Suplement inter alia.

On television, he hosted the landscape and literature programme Rius de tinta (betevé), was sub-director of L’illa del tresor (canal 33) and has presented five seasons of the literary programme Qwerty on Btv, where he has also been an advisor to the magazine programme Àrtic, as well as presenter for the interview programme Terrícoles.

Moreover, he writes for Spanish publications in addition to giving talks about literature and music, and teaching in the master’s course on publishing at the Universitat Autònoma de Barcelona.

Among the books he has co-authored are Breve historia del leer (a Brief History of reading, Ariel, 2009) and El fin de una época (the End of an Epoch, Barril & Barral, 2011).

References 

Journalists from Catalonia
People from Barcelona
Spanish radio journalists
1978 births
Living people